Þorvaldur Skúlason (April 30, 1906 – August 30, 1984) was an Icelandic painter. One of the pioneers of abstract art in Iceland. Influenced by French Cubism, which he met in France in the 1940s.

Life 
He was born in Bordeyri.

Notes 

1906 births
1984 deaths
Thorvaldur Skulason
Thorvaldur Skulason
Male painters